Matthew John Breida (born February 28, 1995) is an American football running back for the New York Giants of the National Football League (NFL). He played college football at Georgia Southern and signed with the San Francisco 49ers as an undrafted free agent in 2017. He has also played for the Miami Dolphins.

Early years
Breida's adoptive parents moved the family from Hudson, Florida, to Spring Hill north of Tampa. There, Breida attended Nature Coast Technical High School in nearby Brooksville, Florida. He played high school football for the Sharks.

College career
Breida played college football at Georgia Southern. As a sophomore in 2014, he rushed for a Sun Belt Conference-leading 1,485 yards (second most by a GSU sophomore to Adrian Peterson) and 17 touchdowns on 171 carries, along with eight receptions for 97 yards and a touchdown. This included a career-best 210 yards against Navy on November 15. As a junior in 2015, he improved to 1,609 yards (second in the conference to Larry Rose III) and a conference-leading 17 touchdowns on 203 carries. As a senior in 2016, his statistics declined to 646 rushing yards and three touchdowns on 168 carries, along with 11 receptions for 53 yards and two touchdowns. This significant decrease in output was not due to injury, but at least partially due to first-time head coach Tyson Summers' unsuccessful move from a triple option offense. Breida's 8.7 and 7.9 yards per carry his sophomore and junior years are the two best in school history, and despite only two productive years, he finished 6th in school history in total rushing yards.

Statistics

Professional career

Due to his disappointing senior year, Breida was not invited to the NFL Combine. However, he performed well at his pro day, running a 4.38 40-Yard Dash
recording a 42-inch Vertical Jump, 11-Foot-2 Broad Jump and completing 23 reps on the Bench Press test. Breida signed with the San Francisco 49ers, one of numerous undrafted free agents, on May 4, 2017.

San Francisco 49ers

2017 season
Breida entered the 2017 season as the backup to Carlos Hyde in the 49ers' backfield. On September 10, 2017, in his NFL debut, Breida had four rushes for 11 yards in the season opening 23–3 home loss to the Carolina Panthers. In Week 8, against the Philadelphia Eagles, he recorded his first NFL touchdown, a 21-yard reception from quarterback C. J. Beathard. On November 12, against the New York Giants, he scored his first rushing touchdown in the 31–21 victory. In Week 16, against the Jacksonville Jaguars, he had a season-high 74 rushing yards and a 30-yard rushing touchdown in the 44–33 victory. In the season finale, which was a 34–13 victory over the Los Angeles Rams, he had 72 rushing yards and a 32-yard reception. Breida finished his rookie season with 465 rushing yards, two rushing touchdowns, 21 receptions, 180 receiving yards, and a receiving touchdown. This was third on the 6–10 team in yards-from-scrimmage, and 14th among NFL rookies.

2018 season
Breida entered the season expecting to back up newly signed free agent Jerick McKinnon, but McKinnon tore his ACL prior to the start of the season thrusting him to compete for the starting role with Alfred Morris. Breida began the season as backup to Morris, but out-gained the veteran with 46 yards in the season opening loss to the Minnesota Vikings. He started for the first time in his career in Week 2 against the Detroit Lions, and finished with a career-high 138 rushing yards (which also led the NFL in Week 2) and a touchdown as the 49ers won 30–27. His 66-yard touchdown in the third quarter was second only to Colin Kaepernick's 90-yarder in 2014 for the longest run by a 49er since 2009. Frequently hampered by minor injuries, Breida split carries with veterans Morris and Raheem Mostert. Though he had 90 yards the following game against the Kansas City Chiefs, he averaged 11 carries for just 43 yards over the next six games, losing the NFL lead in yards per attempt to Detroit's Kerryon Johnson and Cleveland's Nick Chubb in Week 8. He rebounded with a 17-carry, 101-yard performance in a Week 10 loss to the New York Giants, and in his Week 11 return to the Tampa area, Breida recorded 106 yards on 14 rushes to move back to second in the NFL (behind Green Bay's Aaron Jones) with 5.8 yards-per-carry, and added 34 receiving yards. In Week 13 against the Seattle Seahawks, Breida had three receptions for 51 yards, but only five rushes for six yards before suffering an injury, and missing the next game. He returned two weeks later again in the second divisional game against the Seattle Seahawks, and recorded 96 yards-from-scrimmage in the win. In Week 16, against the Chicago Bears, he had just four rushes for 20 yards before again suffering an ankle injury, which placed him on injured reserve for the rest of the season. Despite numerous health problems, Breida led the injury-plagued 4–12 49ers with 814 rushing yards and three rushing touchdowns, and was second on the team only to NFL-record-setter George Kittle with 1,075 yards-from-scrimmage. His 5.3 yards per attempt was fourth among qualified NFL rushers.

2019 season

With continued complications in McKinnon's recovery, Breida entered the season as a co-starter with free agent acquisition Tevin Coleman. During Week 2 against the Cincinnati Bengals, Breida rushed for 121 yards on 12 carries in the 41-17 road victory. After a Week 4 bye, Breida rushed for 114 yards and an 83-yard touchdown on 11 carries in a 31–3 victory against the Cleveland Browns. He also caught three passes for 15 yards and a touchdown. He reached 22.30 mph on the 83-yard touchdown run, the fastest speed reached by a ball carrier on any play since the start of the previous season, making him responsible for two of the top three fastest speeds reached in that span (22.30 mph and 22.09 mph respectively). Late in the season, Breida was used less frequently as Raheem Mostert took over the second-string role.

Breida finished the 2019 season with 623 rushing yards and a touchdown along with 19 receptions for 120 yards and a touchdown. He was fifth in the NFL with 5.1 yards per carry, his third consecutive season in the top 10. Despite not seeing much playing time in the playoffs, Breida and his 49ers reached Super Bowl LIV, but were defeated by the Kansas City Chiefs.

On March 17, 2020, the 49ers placed a second-round restricted free agent tender on Breida. He signed the contract on April 16, 2020.

Miami Dolphins
On April 25, 2020, during the 2020 NFL Draft, Breida was traded to the Miami Dolphins for a fifth-round pick, which the 49ers used to select West Virginia offensive lineman Colton McKivitz. Breida was placed on the reserve/COVID-19 list by the Dolphins on December 4, 2020, and activated on December 16. He finished the 2020 season with 59 carries for 254 rushing yards to go along with nine receptions for 96 receiving yards.

Buffalo Bills
On March 29, 2021, Breida signed a one-year contract with the Buffalo Bills. Sparingly used due to the presence of running backs Zack Moss and Devin Singletary, Breida scored his first touchdowns with the Bills in Week 10 against the New York Jets. Playing mainly on special teams with just eight offensive snaps, he rushed the ball three times for 28 yards and a touchdown, in addition to catching three passes for 22 yards and a touchdown, but also lost a fumble. In the 2021 season, Breida finished with 26 carries for 125 rushing yards and one rushing touchdown to go along with seven receptions for 72 receiving yards and two receiving touchdowns.

New York Giants
On March 21, 2022, Breida signed a one-year contract with the New York Giants. Being used as the back-up to Saquan Barkley, Breida scored his first and his only touchdown of the regular season week 10 versus the Detroit Lions. Receiving an uptick in snaps compared to last season, Breida had 54 rushing attempts for 220 yards and touchdown, as well as having 20 receptions for 118 yards. In the 2 playoff games he played he had 7 rushing attempts for 31 yards and a touchdown. He also had a single reception for 19 yards.

On March 14, 2023, the Giants re-signed Breida to a one-year contract.

NFL career statistics

Personal life
Breida was adopted by Terri and Mike Breida on March 2, 1995. They later adopted a second child, Josh. The couple were independently disabled by chronic health problems and car accidents in 2006 and 2003, respectively. During his time at Georgia Southern, Breida volunteered as a reader and speaker at elementary schools in two states, which contributed to his nomination as a Senior Class Award finalist and Honor Roll member.

References

External links

Twitter
New York Giants bio
Georgia Southern Eagles bio

1995 births
Living people
American football running backs
Buffalo Bills players
Georgia Southern Eagles football players
Miami Dolphins players
People from Brandon, Florida
People from Brooksville, Florida
Players of American football from Florida
San Francisco 49ers players
Sportspeople from the Tampa Bay area
New York Giants players